Underground Sounds is the debut album of American recording artist and guitarist of Eyes Set to Kill, Lexia. The album was released October 12, 2010 by BreakSilence Records. Recording took place at Shire Recorders, Austin, Texas. The album is different from her band because it is pop. The album consists of new original pop, acoustic, and electronica songs as well as covers from her band (done acoustically) and a Radiohead cover. "Let Me In" was released as the first single with a video which is featured as a bonus track on Broken Frames.

Track listing
 Intro – 0:48
 Basements – 3:19
 Climbing Up the Walls (Radiohead Cover) – 3:31
 Let Me In – 4:13
 Over – 3:58
 Come Home – 4:11
 Still Here – 3:07
 Memories – 3:10
 World Outside – 3:32
 Reach – 3:59
 Waste – 3:18
 Come Home (Acoustic) – 4:19

Credits
Band
 Lexia – vocals, guitars, keyboards, synthesizers, piano, programming

Production
 Kevin Zinger – executive producer
 Brad X – executive producer
 Thom Flowers – audio mixer, engineer, producer
 David Aguilera – management
 Casey Quintal – art director
 Nathaniel Taylor – photography

Additional musicians
 Angus Cooke – cello
 Tom Breyfogle – programming
 Mike Kumagai – programming
 David Aguilera – programming

References

2010 debut albums
Pop albums by American artists